Chilibre is a town and  corregimiento in Panamá District, Panamá Province, Panama with a population of 53,955 as of 2010. Its population as of 1990 was 27,135; its population as of 2000 was 40,475.

Climate
According to the Köppen Climate Classification system, Chilibre has a tropical monsoon climate, abbreviated "Am" on climate maps.

References

Corregimientos of Panamá Province
Populated places in Panamá Province
Panamá District